Bengt Erik Benedictus Pohjanen (born 26 June 1944 in Kassa in Pajala, Norrbotten, Sweden), is a Swedish author, translator and priest living in Överkalix.

Pohjanen won the Rubus arcticus in 1995 and the Eyvind Johnson literature prize in 2010.

References 

1944 births
Living people
People from Pajala Municipality
Writers from Norrbotten
Swedish male writers
Converts to Eastern Orthodoxy from Protestantism
Eastern Orthodox Christians from Sweden
Swedish people of Finnish descent